Grown Ups is a British television sitcom aired by the BBC in 1997. Written by Paul Makin, it ran for a total of six episodes.

The series featured a group of friends from University who had stayed together 15 years later. Jim and Clare got married, as did Bob and Mel. They were all trying to stay like their younger selves of 15 years ago.

The cast were Penny Bunton as Mel, Tony Gardner as Murray, Pippa Haywood as Claire, Andrew Powell as Martin, James Simmons as Jim, and Jason Watkins as Bob. The series was directed by Angela De Chastelai Smith and produced by Esta Charkham. Executive Producers for the series were Claire Hinson, plus Birds of a Feather Laurence Marks and Maurice Gran.

External links

1997 British television series debuts
1997 British television series endings
1990s British sitcoms
BBC television sitcoms